Ágasegyháza is a  village and municipality in Bács-Kiskun county, in the Southern Great Plain region of southern Hungary.

Geography

The village's post code is 6076 and the area code is 76.

References

Geography of Bács-Kiskun County
Populated places in Bács-Kiskun County